are traditional Japanese entryway areas for a house, apartment, or building, a combination of a porch and a doormat. It is usually located inside the building directly in front of the door.

A secondary function is a place for brief visits without being invited across the  step into the house proper. For example, where a pizza delivery driver in an English-speaking country would normally stand on the porch and conduct business through the open front door, in Japan a food delivery would traditionally have taken place across the  step.

After removing shoes, one must avoid stepping on the tiled or concrete  in socks or with bare feet, to avoid bringing dirt into the house. Once inside, generally one will change into : slippers or shoes intended for indoor wear.

 are also occasionally found in other buildings in Japan, especially in old-fashioned businesses.

Design
 are normally recessed into the floor, to contain any dirt that is tracked in from the outside (as in a mud room).

Schools and  have large  with compartments for each person's outdoor shoes. In private residences,  may be absent, and shoes are usually turned to face the door so they can be slipped on easily when leaving.

History 

The custom of removing one's shoes before entering the house is believed to go back over one thousand years to the pre-historical era of elevated-floor structures. It has continued to the present, even after the Westernization of the Japanese home, which began in the Meiji period (1868–1912).

See also 
 Engawa (traditional Japanese veranda)

References

External links

 What is this?  .

Japanese words and phrases
Japanese home
Rooms